Crossodactylus trachystomus is a species of frog in the family Hylodidae. It is endemic to the Espinhaço Mountains in Minas Gerais, Brazil.

Taxonomy
Until 2015 three Crossodactylus species were known from the Espinhaço Mountains: Crossodactylus trachystomus (not observed in the field since the mid 1980s),  an undescribed species most similar to C. trachystomus, and Crossodactylus bokermanni described as a new species in 1985. Re-analysis of old samples and analysis of new samples could not show consistent differences between these taxa, for which Crossodactylus trachystomus is the valid name.

Description
Males measure  and females  in snout–vent length. The body is slender, and the head is longer than wide. The canthus rostralis is sharp. The tympanum is distinct.

Habitat and conservation
Crossodactylus trachystomus lives on the ground along permanent streams with sandy and rocky bottoms and bordered with grass and shrubs in montane savanna areas, and inside semideciduous Atlantic Forest. Breeding takes place in streams where males call exposed on stones or from sandy margins.

Habitat loss is occurring in the range of this species. It occurs in the Serra do Cipó National Park.

References

trachystomus
Endemic fauna of Brazil
Amphibians of Brazil
Amphibians described in 1862
Taxa named by Christian Frederik Lütken
Taxa named by Johannes Theodor Reinhardt
Taxonomy articles created by Polbot